Setiabudi MRT Station (or Setiabudi Astra MRT Station, with Astra International granted for naming rights) is a rapid transit station on the North-South Line of the Jakarta MRT. Located at Karet Kunuingan, Setiabudi, South Jakarta.

History 

This station is located near Menara Astra, which is headquarter of Astra.

Station layout

Gallery

References

External links
 
  

South Jakarta
Jakarta MRT stations
Railway stations opened in 2019